Cameraria fasciella is a moth of the family Gracillariidae. It is known from Kentucky and Ohio in the United States.

The wingspan is 6–7 mm.

The larvae feed on Quercus species, including Quercus tinctoria and Quercus velutina. They mine the leaves of their host plant. The mine has the form of an irregular yellowish blotch mine on the upperside of the leaf.

References

Cameraria (moth)

Moths of North America
Lepidoptera of the United States
Leaf miners
Moths described in 1891
Taxa named by Thomas de Grey, 6th Baron Walsingham